Robert Wade Barnwell (January 1, 1916 – September 19, 1985) was an American football and basketball coach.  He served as the head football coach at Western Illinois University in Macomb, Illinois for one season, in 1944 season, compiling a record of 0–8.  Barnwell was also the head basketball coach at Western Illinois from 1943 to 1946, tallying a mark of 24–22.  Barnwell attended University of Missouri and Columbia University Teachers' College prior to coming to Western Illinois.

Barnwell died in 1985.

Head coaching record

Football

References

External links
 

1916 births
1985 deaths
Basketball coaches from Missouri
Western Illinois Leathernecks football coaches
Western Illinois Leathernecks men's basketball coaches
University of Missouri alumni
Sportspeople from Springfield, Missouri